Uncial 077 (in the Gregory-Aland numbering), is a Greek uncial manuscript of the New Testament, paleographically assigned to the 5th century. Only one leaf of the codex has survived.

Description
The codex contains a part of the Acts of the Apostles (13:28-29). 

The Greek text of this codex is a representative of the Alexandrian text-type with some alien readings. Aland placed it in Category II. 

Currently it is dated by the INTF to the 5th century.

The codex is located in Sinai Harris App. 5.

See also

List of New Testament uncials
Textual criticism

References

Further reading
J. Rendel Harris, in Smith Lewis, Agnes (1894). “Appendix: Fragments, Chiefly Greek.” Catalogue of the Syriac Mss. in the Convent of S. Catharine on Mount Sinai. Studia Sinaitica No. 1. London: C. J. Clay and Sons. 98, No. 5.
Uncial 077 LDAB

Greek New Testament uncials
5th-century biblical manuscripts